Papilio hyppason is a Neotropical butterfly of the family Papilionidae. It is found in Suriname, Brazil, Bolivia, Peru, Venezuela and Ecuador.

Description
Tailless. Pronotum spotted with red. Hindwing beneath with red basal spot behind the cell. Subcostal of the hindwing much more proximal than the 2. median. Sexes different from one another, each variable in itself, male-f. hyppason Cr. (= hippasonides Grose-Smith) has a broad band on the forewing, mostly abbreviated. In male-f ptilion R. & J. the band of the forewing is narrow and placed farther from the cell. The female occurs likewise in 2 principal forms: female-f.amosis Cr. has a black forewing, on which scarcely a trace of white discal spots is visible. In female-f.
paraensis Bates, on the contrary, the forewing has one or several white or yellowish white spots. These forms occur together, though not everywhere.

Biology
The butterfly is found at the edges of swampy woods and has a swift flight. It is a lowland species. The larva feeds on Piper belemense.

References
Notes

Sources
Lewis, H. L., 1974 Butterflies of the World  Page 25, figure 5

External links

Butterfly corner Images from Naturhistorisches Museum Wien

hyppason
Papilionidae of South America
Butterflies described in 1775